This is a list of birds whose range includes, at least in part, the Sierra Madre Occidental, a mountain range in western Mexico and the extreme southwest of the United States.

Bright-rumped attila, Attila spadiceus
Lazuli bunting, Passerina amoena
Bushtit, Psaltriparus minimus
Mexican chickadee, Poecile sclateri
American dipper, Cinclus mexicanus
Blue-hooded euphonia, Euphonia elegantissima
Cordilleran flycatcher, Empidonax occidentalis
Hammond's flycatcher, Empidonax hammondii
Pine flycatcher, Empidonax affinis
Evening grosbeak, Coccothraustes vespertinus
Yellow grosbeak, Pheucticus chrysopeplus
Rusty-crowned ground-sparrow, Melozone kieneri
Blue-throated hummingbird, Lampornis clemenciae
Broad-tailed hummingbird, Selasphorus platycercus
Magnificent hummingbird, Eugenes fulgens
White-eared hummingbird, Hylocharis leucotis
Mexican jay, Aphelocoma ultramarina
White-tailed kite, Elanus leucurus
Black-throated magpie-jay, Calocitta colliei
Purple martin, Progne subis
Buff-collared nightjar, Antrostomus ridgwayi
Pygmy nuthatch, Sitta pygmaea
Elf owl, Micrathene whitneyi
Flammulated owl, Otus flammeolus
Spotted owl, Strix occidentalis
Whiskered screech-owl, Megascops trichopsis
Thick-billed parrot, Rhynchopsitta pachyrhyncha
Western wood pewee, Contopus sordidulus
Band-tailed pigeon, Patagioenas fasciata
Elegant quail, Callipepla douglasii
Montezuma quail, Cyrtonyx montezumae
Eared quetzal, Euptilotis neoxenus
Painted redstart, Myioborus pictus
Townsend's solitaire, Myadestes townsendi
Five-striped sparrow, Amphispizopsis quinquestriata
Rufous-crowned sparrow, Aimophila ruficeps
Plain-capped starthroat, Heliomaster constantii
Vaux's swift, Chaetura vauxi
White-throated swift, Aeronautes saxatalis
Flame-colored tanager, Piranga bidentata
Hepatic tanager, Piranga flava
Red-headed tanager, Piranga erythrocephala
Bridled titmouse, Baeolophus wollweberi
Spotted towhee, Pipilo maculatus
Hutton's vireo, Vireo huttoni
Plumbeous vireo, Vireo plumbeus
Yellow-green vireo, Vireo flavoviridis
Golden-browed warbler, Basileuterus belli
Grace's warbler, Setophaga graciae
Hermit warbler, Setophaga occidentalis
Red warbler, Cardellina ruber
Red-faced warbler, Cardellina rubrifrons
Yellow warbler, Setophaga petechia
Acorn woodpecker, Melanerpes formicivorus
Arizona woodpecker, Picoides arizonae

 
Sierra Madre Occidental
'birds
Sierra Madre Occidental